Benjamin Benson Ofori is a Ghanaian politician and was a member of the first parliament of the second Republic of Ghana. He represented the Afram constituency under the membership of the Progress Party.

Early life and education 
Benjamin was born on 18 October 1927 in the Eastern region of Ghana. He attended Presbyterian College Of Education, Akropong formerly Akropong Presbyterian Training College where he obtained his Teachers' Training Certificate. He then moved to Accra to advance his education at the University of Ghana , Legon where he obtained his Bachelor of Arts degree with a specialization in Geography. He worked as a teacher before going into parliament.

Politics 
Benjamin began his political career in 1969 when he became the parliamentary candidate for the Progress Party (PP) to represent Afram constituency prior to the commencement of the 1969 Ghanaian parliamentary election. He assumed office as a member of the first parliament of the second republic of Ghana on 1 October 1969 after being pronounced winner at the 1969 Ghanaian parliamentary election. His tenure ended on 13 January 1972.

Personal life 
He is a Presbyterian.

References 

1927 births
Ghanaian MPs 1969–1972
Living people
People from Eastern Region (Ghana)
University of Ghana alumni
Presbyterian College of Education, Akropong alumni